Ematheudes setigera is a species of snout moth in the genus Ematheudes. It was described by Jay C. Shaffer in 1998, and is known from South Africa.

References

Moths described in 1998
Anerastiini